Excoecaria bantamensis is a species of flowering plant in the family Euphorbiaceae. It was described in 1863. It is native to southwest Thailand, Jawa, Borneo (in western Kalimantan), and the Philippines.

References

bantamensis
Plants described in 1863
Taxa named by Johannes Müller Argoviensis